The 2007 Brabantse Pijl was the 47th edition of the Brabantse Pijl cycle race and was held on 1 April 2007. The race started in Zaventem and finished in Alsemberg. The race was won by Óscar Freire.

General classification

References

2007
Brabantse Pijl